Anonychomyrma itinerans is a species of ant in the genus Anonychomyrma. Described by Lowne in 1865, the species is endemic to Australia.

References

Anonychomyrma
Hymenoptera of Australia
Insects described in 1865